The Heavyweight competition at the 2021 AIBA World Boxing Championships was held between 26 October and 6 November.

Results

Finals

Top half

Section 1

Section 2

Bottom half

Section 3

Section 4

References

External links
Draw

Heavyweight